Flavio Emoli (23 August 1934 – 5 October 2015) was an Italian professional footballer who played as a midfielder. He is mostly remembered for his ten years with Juventus, where he won three Serie A titles, and served as the team's captain.

Honours
Juventus
 Serie A: 1957–58, 1959–60, 1960–61.
 Coppa Italia: 1958–59, 1959–60.

External links
 
 note of his death

1934 births
2015 deaths
Italian footballers
Association football midfielders
Italy international footballers
Serie A players
Serie B players
Genoa C.F.C. players
Juventus F.C. players
S.S.C. Napoli players